Li Shuirong (born 1956)  is a Chinese billionaire and businessman, the chairman of the , which produces petrochemicals.

In 1989, Li Shuirong founded the Yinong Network Chemical Fiber Factory that produced polyester fiber cloth. After the polyester industry shifted upstream, he founded the Zhejiang Rongsheng Holding Group. In 2020, Zhejiang Rongsheng Holding Group became the first private oil refiner that obtained permission from the Chinese government to export refined oil products.

Li Shuirong made the 2022 Forbes Billionaires List with an estimated wealth of $10.3 billion and occupied the 192nd position.

References 

1956 births
Living people
Chinese billionaires
20th-century Chinese businesspeople
21st-century Chinese businesspeople